Carl Roesner (19 June 1804, Vienna - 13 July 1869, Steyr) was an Austrian architect.

Life 
He studied architecture in Vienna and Rome. In 1826, he began his work as a proofreader for lectures at the Academy of Fine Arts Vienna and, in 1835, became a Professor there. He gravitated to the Romanticists and concentrated on sacred art. Wilhelm Stiassny was one of his students. He was also editor of the Allgemeine Bauzeitung (General Construction News).

As he worked during the time of the Austro-Hungarian Empire, many of his buildings are now outside Austria. A street in Vienna's Meidling district was named the "Roesnergasse" in his honor.

Selected projects 
 Friedhofskapelle Pinkafeld, Pinkafeld, 1835
 Erlöserkirche, Landstraße, 1836 
 Johann Nepomuk Kirche, Praterstraße, Leopoldstadt, 1841-1846
 Meidlinger Pfarrkirche, Meidling, 1845
 St. Ulrich of Augsburg Church, Smlednik (central Slovenia), 1847
 Arsenalkirche, Landstraße, 1856
 St.Josephs Kirche, Kalocsa, 1859
 Cathedral of St. Peter and St. Paul, Đakovo, begun 1866, completed by Friedrich von Schmidt and Hermann Bollé

Sources 

 

1804 births
1869 deaths
19th-century Austrian architects
Architects from Vienna